Callum Crane (born 8 March 1996) is a Scottish footballer, who plays as a defender for Edinburgh City. Crane has previously played for Hibernian, Berwick Rangers, Alloa Athletic, Livingston and Raith Rovers.

Career

Hibernian
Started his youth football at AC Oxgangs, a local team playing at Colinton Mains Park. Crane progressed through the Hibernian academy and signed a contract with the club in January 2015 that was due to run until 2018. Crane moved on loan in November 2015 to Berwick Rangers, where he stayed for the rest of the 2015/16 season.

Crane appeared for the Hibs first team in a pre-season friendly against Birmingham City, then made his competitive debut in a Challenge Cup match with Highland League club Turriff United. He made his league debut for Hibs on 26 February 2017, appearing as a substitute in a 2–2 draw with Dunfermline Athletic.

Crane was loaned to Alloa Athletic in August 2017. Hibs announced in May 2018 that Crane would be released at the end of the 2017–18 season.

Livingston
Crane signed a two-year contract with Livingston in June 2018. On 28 September 2018, Crane joined Scottish League One side Raith Rovers  on loan  until mid January. The loan was extended until the end of the season.

Edinburgh City
Crane joined Edinburgh City in June 2019 after terminating his Livingston contract.

Career statistics

References

1996 births
Living people
Footballers from Edinburgh
Association football defenders
Scottish footballers
Scottish Professional Football League players
Hibernian F.C. players
Berwick Rangers F.C. players
Alloa Athletic F.C. players
Livingston F.C. players
Raith Rovers F.C. players
F.C. Edinburgh players